Olivier Rochus (born 18 January 1981) is a retired Belgian tennis player. He is the younger brother of Christophe Rochus, also a former top-40 tennis player.

Rochus won two singles titles in his career and in 2004 won the French Open doubles title, partnering fellow Belgian Xavier Malisse. His career-high singles ranking is world No. 24.
 

Career

Juniors
Rochus was a partner of Roger Federer on the junior circuit, winning the boys' doubles title at Wimbledon in 1998.

As a junior, he compiled a singles win–loss record of 81–30 (42–20 in doubles), reaching as high as No. 11 in the world in 1997 (and No. 16 in doubles the following year). Rochus reached at least the quarterfinals of all four junior Grand Slam tournaments (including the semifinals of the French Open and Wimbledon).

1999–2008
He won his first title in Palermo in 2000, defeating his brother in the semifinals and Diego Nargiso in the final. In 2003, he achieved his greatest Master Series result, reaching the quarter-finals of the Hamburg Masters.

He has represented Belgium at two Olympic Games in both the singles and the doubles competitions at Athens and Beijing.

In May 2006, he reached the final of the ATP tournament in Munich, setting up the first ever all-Belgian men's singles final against Kristof Vliegen. He won that final in straight sets.

In June, Rochus faced world No. 1, Roger Federer, in the quarterfinals of the Gerry Weber Open. Rochus held four match points in the second set at 5–6 and in the tie-break. He could not close out the match and eventually lost in three tiebreaks.

2009
He reached the final of the Stockholm Open, after winning to Swede Andreas Vinciguerra in the first round, eighth seed Feliciano López, and Jarkko Nieminen. In the semifinals, he beat best Brazilian Thomaz Bellucci. In the final, he met former Australian Open finalist Marcos Baghdatis, but lost in two sets.

One week later at the Grand Prix de Lyon, he won his first match against French qualifier Vincent Millot. He faced world No. 8, Jo-Wilfried Tsonga, but lost in two short sets.

His next tournament was the Swiss Indoors, where he first won his three qualifying matches. In the first round of the tournament, he lost to his former double partner and world No. 1, Roger Federer.

The last tournament of his tennis season was the AXA Belgian Masters (Challenger), where he met compatriot Steve Darcis in the semifinal.

2010
At the Sony Ericsson Open he defeated Richard Gasquet and the 2007 titlist and second seed Novak Djokovic.

In the Nice tournament, one week prior to Roland Garros, he pulled off another upset, defeating 2009 French Open finalist Robin Söderling.

He defeated Raven Klaasen of South Africa at the Hall of Fame Tennis Championship, but lost to Mardy Fish in the final in three sets.

2011
In March, Rochus lost in the fourth round in Miami to Federer, after defeating Blaž Kavčič, Marcos Baghdatis, and Mikhail Youzhny in the first three rounds. In July, he made it to the final in Newport, where he was defeated by John Isner in straight sets.

2012–13
Rochus had his best success earlier in 2012, reaching the final in Auckland. He lost to Nicolás Almagro in the first round of Wimbledon.

In 2013, he played mostly on the Challenger Tour, never advancing beyond the second round of an ATP event.

ATP career finals

Singles: 10 (2 wins, 8 losses)

Doubles: 7 (2 wins, 5 losses)

Performance timelines

Singles

1Held as Hamburg Masters (outdoor clay) until 2008, Madrid Masters (outdoor clay) 2009–present.
2Held as Stuttgart Masters (indoor hard) until 2001, Madrid Masters (indoor hard) from 2002 to 2008, and Shanghai Masters (outdoor hard) 2009–present.

Doubles

Top 10 wins

References

External links

 
 
 
 
 
 

1981 births
Living people
Belgian male tennis players
French Open champions
Hopman Cup competitors
Olympic tennis players of Belgium
Sportspeople from Namur (city)
People from Chaumont-Gistoux
Tennis players at the 2004 Summer Olympics
Tennis players at the 2008 Summer Olympics
Tennis players at the 2012 Summer Olympics
Wimbledon champions
Wimbledon junior champions
Grand Slam (tennis) champions in men's doubles
Grand Slam (tennis) champions in boys' doubles
21st-century Belgian people